Acrolepia moriuti is a moth of the family Acrolepiidae. It was described by Reinhard Gaedike in 1982. It is found in Japan.

References

Moths described in 1982
Acrolepiidae